Tormod Hausken Jacobsen (born 17 August 1993) is a Norwegian former professional racing cyclist. He won the Norwegian National Road Race Championships in 2014.

Major results
2014
 1st  Road race, National Road Championships
 9th Eschborn-Frankfurt City Loop U23

References

External links

1993 births
Living people
Norwegian male cyclists
Sportspeople from Stavanger